2nd Independent Division of Shandong Provincial Military District was a Chinese People's Liberation Army unit that was formed on August 3, 1966 from Public Security Contingent of Shandong province. The division was composed of four infantry regiments (4th to 7th).

The division was disbanded in October 1976.

References

ISh2
Military units and formations established in 1966
Military units and formations disestablished in 1976